Kiowa County is a county located in the southwestern part of the U.S. state of Oklahoma. As of the 2010 census, the population was 9,446. Its county seat is Hobart. The county was created in 1901 as part of Oklahoma Territory. It was named for the Kiowa people.

History
In 1892, the Jerome Commission began enrolling the Kiowas, Comanches and Apaches to prepare for the opening of their reservation to settlement by whites. Dennis Flynn, the territorial representative to the U. S. Congress, proposed holding a lottery for opening the reservation. He argued successfully that the lottery would be safer and more orderly than land runs used earlier. Individuals could register at offices in Lawton or El Reno. 165,000 individuals registered for 13,000 160-acre claims. The drawing was held August 6, 1901. After the opening, the area was designated as Kiowa County in Oklahoma Territory. The town of Hobart, named for Vice President Garrett A. Hobart, was designated as county seat.

By 1908, residents of the southern part of the county were already agitating for a new county to be formed. In 1910, Governor Charles N. Haskell proclaimed that parts of Kiowa and Comanche Counties would become the new Swanson County. The new county became defunct in 1911, after the Oklahoma Supreme Court voided the change.

Geography
The county is largely composed of flatlands, although the southern border is covered by the Washita Mountains.

The North Fork of the Red River serves as the southern and western boundaries of Jackson County. Water bodies include Lake Altus-Lugert which impounds the North Fork of the Red River, and Tom Steed Reservoir on Otter Creek. Other streams in the county are the Washita River and Elk Creek.

Major highways
  U.S. Highway 62
  U.S. Highway 183
  State Highway 9
  State Highway 19
  State Highway 44

Adjacent counties
 Washita County (north)
 Caddo County (east)
 Comanche County (southeast)
 Tillman County (south)
 Jackson County (southwest)
 Greer County (west)

Demographics

As of the census of 2000, there were 10,227 people, 4,208 households, and 2,815 families residing in the county.  The population density was 10 people per square mile (4/km2).  There were 5,304 housing units at an average density of 5 per square mile (2/km2).  The racial makeup of the county was 83.54% White, 4.67% Black or African American, 6.31% Native American, 0.31% Asian, 0.06% Pacific Islander, 2.68% from other races, and 2.42% from two or more races.  6.74% of the population were Hispanic or Latino of any race.

There were 4,208 households, out of which 27.90% had children under the age of 18 living with them, 52.00% were married couples living together, 10.40% had a female householder with no husband present, and 33.10% were non-families. 30.60% of all households were made up of individuals, and 16.30% had someone living alone who was 65 years of age or older.  The average household size was 2.35 and the average family size was 2.92.

In the county, the population was spread out, with 24.20% under the age of 18, 7.50% from 18 to 24, 24.50% from 25 to 44, 23.40% from 45 to 64, and 20.30% who were 65 years of age or older.  The median age was 41 years. For every 100 females there were 95.70 males.  For every 100 females age 18 and over, there were 90.70 males.

The median income for a household in the county was $26,053, and the median income for a family was $34,654. Males had a median income of $25,552 versus $19,497 for females. The per capita income for the county was $14,231.  About 15.00% of families and 19.30% of the population were below the poverty line, including 23.30% of those under age 18 and 15.70% of those age 65 or over.

Politics

Political Culture

Communities

Cities
 Hobart (county seat)
 Snyder

Towns
 Cooperton
 Gotebo
 Lone Wolf
 Mountain Park
 Mountain View
 Roosevelt

Unincorporated communities
 Babbs
 Cambridge
 Lugert
 Saddle Mountain

Notable people
 Tommy Franks (1945- ), U. S. Army general (retired) and Commander of U. S. Central Command during the Iraq War; lives in Roosevelt, Oklahoma since his army retirement.
 Dale Meinert (1933-2004), an All-Pro linebacker for the St. Louis Cardinals, was born at Lone Wolf.
 N. Scott Momaday (1934-), 1969 Pulitzer Prize winner for House Made of Dawn, is from Mountain View.
 Col. Jack Treadwell (1919-1977) of Snyder, who served in the 180th Infantry, Forty-fifth Infantry Division, during World War II, received the Congressional Medal of Honor.
 Lt. Gen. La Vern E. Weber (1923-2004), born at Lone Wolf, served as chief of the National Guard Bureau.

See also
 National Register of Historic Places listings in Kiowa County, Oklahoma

References

 
Oklahoma counties
1901 establishments in Oklahoma Territory
Populated places established in 1901